Sadabhau Khot (born 1 June 1964) is a politician from Maharashtra state of India. He was President of Rayat Kranti Sanghtna. He contested 2014 Lok sabha elections from Madha (Lok Sabha constituency) as SWP /NDA candidate. He elected unopposed as Member of legislative Council from Maharashtra legislative assembly members seat on 10 June 2016. On 8 July he was inducted into Minister council as a Minister of state in Maharashtra government. He was given charge of agricultural, horticulture and marketing Ministry.

References

People from Solapur district
Marathi politicians
National Democratic Alliance candidates in the 2014 Indian general election
Swabhimani Paksha politicians
Living people
Members of the Maharashtra Legislative Council
1964 births